The 1985 season of the Venezuelan Primera División, the top category of Venezuelan football, was played by 10 teams. The national champions were Estudiantes de Mérida.

Results

First stage

Final Stage

External links
Venezuela 1985 season at RSSSF

Ven
Venezuelan Primera División seasons
Prim